Sagardari Union, is a union parishad of the Jessore District in the Division of Khulna, Bangladesh.

Geography
Sagardari Union has an area of 24.51 square kilometres. This is the southern most union of Jessore District. It is located 50 km south from Jessore town and 13 km south from Keshabpur town by road. It is bounded by Kapotaksha River and Satkhira District to the west and south, Trimoni, Biddananadakati and Hasanpur union to the north and east.

Demographics
According to the 2011 Bangladesh census, Keshabpur had a population of 24289. and It has is highest literacy rate within Keshabpur Upzilla.

Points of interest
It is the birth place of father of the modern Bengali literature Michael Madhusudan Dutt. he was born on the 25 January 1824. Tourists from all over the world visit "Modhu Palli" and "Modhu Mela", a fair in memory of Modhusudan's birthday, is held every year. In the village of Meherpur a Muslim saint "Hazrat Meher Uddin" tomb over there  who is came with Khan Jahan Ali from Iran to introduce Islam as a new religion in this area. Now the tomb and around forest is famous destination to all people.

Administration
Sagardari Union was established during British Raj on 1870.

Sagardari Union Parishad Complex is located on the banks of Kopotaksha river in Chingra Bazar area of Sagardari Union. The union consists of 9 wards and 16 villages. The union consists of a chairman, 9 ward members and 3 reserved women members. Each of them was directly elected by the people for 5 years.

The wards of the union are:
 Ward No. 1: Banshbaria and Raghurampur
 Ward No. 2: Meherpur and Gopsena
 Ward No. 3: Mirzapur and Bishnapur
 Ward No. 4: Gobindapur and Dharmapur
 Ward No. 5: Kasta and Baruihati
 Ward No. 6: Jhikra and Fatehpur
 Ward No. 6: Chinra
 Ward No. 6: Sagardari and Sheikhpara
 Ward No. 9: Sagardari and Komarpur

Education
Sagardari Union has a number of noted institution like: Sagardari Michael Madhusadan Institution, Sagardari ASK Abu Sharab Sadeq vocational and Commerce College, Sagardari ASK Abu Sharab Sadeq Govt technical school, Sagardari Alim Madrasa, Mehepur Dakil Madrasa, Meherpur govt primary school, Gobindapur Govt primary school.

In 2018 the member of parliament of Jessore-3 and Jessore-6 has been proposed to set a cultural university to the honor of poet Micheal Madhusudan Dutta in Sagardari. This project now under hold to approve.

References

Unions of Keshabpur Upazila
Unions of Jessore District
Unions of Khulna Division